Wicksburg, also spelled Wicksburgh, is an unincorporated community in Houston County, Alabama, United States.

History
Wicksburg is named in honor of Elijah Trawick, who was the first postmaster. A post office operated under the name Wicksburg from 1878 to 1908.

The Wicksburg soil series is named for the community.

Notable people
 Nathan Mathis, politician

References

Unincorporated communities in Houston County, Alabama
Unincorporated communities in Alabama